The Institute for Public Health Sciences at Yeshiva University provides research and training opportunities for faculty, students, and researchers interested in public health and preventive medicine, consolidating university resources in these areas and creating new programs, including a Master of Public Health degree. The institute emphasizes public health research with a particular focus on the behavioral determinants of health, global health issues, and health disparities. 

In addition to Albert Einstein College of Medicine and Ferkauf Graduate School of Psychology, Yeshiva University programs involved include Benjamin N. Cardozo School of Law, Wurzweiler School of Social Work, and Sy Syms School of Business.

The institute is directed by Sonia Suchday and Paul R. Marantz.

External links 
 Yeshiva University
 Albert Einstein College of Medicine
 Benjamin N. Cardozo School of Law

Schools of public health in the United States
Yeshiva University
Medical and health organizations based in New York (state)